Vikram Joshi was an Indian journalist who was shot by unknown assailants and he later died in the hospital. The incident caused widespread criticism of the Uttar Pradesh government among opposition parties as well as media.

Joshi had filed a police complaint on 16 July 2020 against some people who were accused of harassing his niece. On 20 July 2020, while he was on his motorcycle with his daughters, aged 5 and 11, the assailants forcibly stopped his motorcycle and started beating him. Then, one of the suspects shot at his head from close range and the assailants fled the scene. The entire incident was caught in CCTV footage and created outrage across the country. Vikram Joshi succumbed to his injuries on 22 July 2020. 9 men have been arrested in connection with the incident and 1 policeman has been suspended.

Uttar Pradesh Chief Minister Yogi Adityanath announced 10 lakh ex gratia for Vikram Joshi's family.

Reactions 
Former Chief Ministers, Akhilesh Yadav and Mayawati questioned the poor state of law and order in Uttar Pradesh. Congress leader Priyanka Gandhi raised questions about the safety of common people in "Jungle Raj". West Bengal Chief Minister Mamata Banerjee took to social media to express her shock on media's voice being muzzled.

Press Association and Indian Women's Press Corps condemned the killing and demanded probe into the incident as well as other similar incidents of attacks on journalists.

References 

2020 deaths
Deaths by firearm in India
Assassinated Indian journalists
2020 murders in India
People murdered in Uttar Pradesh
Filmed killings in Asia